En stille flirt (A Quiet Flirt) is a Swedish romantic comedy film starring Norwegian actors from 1933. It is the Norwegian-language version of a twin production with the 1934 Swedish-language version En stilla flirt. It is based on the novel Min knapphullsblomst (The Flower in My Buttonhole) by Edith Øberg. It was distributed by the company Svensk Filmindustri. The screenplay was written by Gösta Stevens and the film was directed by Gustaf Molander. It is 95 minutes long.

The Swedish-language version of the film, En stilla flirt, was shot with Swedish actors act the same time. However, the Norwegian actress Tutta Rolf played the female lead in both versions of the film. In the Swedish version, her character was called Diddi Werner, and in the Norwegian version she was called Lillemor.

Tutta sang the title song from the film, which was composed by Jules Sylvain.

Cast
Tutta Rolf as Lillemor von Kragh
Fridtjof Mjøen as Gunnar Green, a doctor
Leif Amble-Næss as Doktor Gerhardt, a beautician
Sofie Bernhoft as Amalia
Aase Bye as Diddi Garbel, a revue prima donna
Frithjof Fearnley as Mr. Wilder
Hilda Fredriksen as Maja, a dressmaker
Henry Gleditsch as Gründer, head of a tailor shop
Mally Haaland as Mrs. Wilder
Margit Lunde as Lotten
Folkman Schaanning as Swanson, a photographer
Agnethe Schibsted-Hansson as Hulda, Green's maid
Aksel Thue as Walle, head of a perfume shop
Emmy Worm-Müller as Marte

References

External links 
 
 En stille flirt at The Swedish Film Database

1933 films
Swedish black-and-white films
Films directed by Gustaf Molander
1930s Norwegian-language films
1930s Swedish films